This Is It: The Best of Faith No More contains 19 signature Faith No More tracks from albums and singles released between 1985-1997. It includes four rarities & the then out-of-print soundtrack cut "The Perfect Crime" from the soundtrack to the movie Bill & Ted's Bogus Journey. It was released by Slash/Rhino Records in 2003.

This collection is notable for being one of the only, among numerous Faith No More compilations, to include material directly from their independently-released debut album We Care a Lot.  It also covers material throughout the remainder of their career (at the time), making it one of the more comprehensive retrospectives on the band.

Track listing
 "Arabian Disco"
 "We Care a Lot" (Slash Version)
 "Anne's Song"
 "Introduce Yourself"
 "From Out of Nowhere"
 "Epic"
 "Falling to Pieces"
 "War Pigs"
 "The Cowboy Song"
 "As the Worm Turns" (Live, 1990)
 "Midlife Crisis"
 "A Small Victory"
 "Be Aggressive"
 "Easy"
 "Digging the Grave"
 "Evidence"
 "Last Cup of Sorrow"
 "Ashes to Ashes"
 "The Perfect Crime"

Reception

This Is It was generally positively received. Allmusic rated the album four stars out of five, and described it as "a fine collection of one of hard rock's all-time best", though noted that "longtime fans may squabble about key tracks that are absent". Classic Rock also gave the collection four stars out of five, praising its "unique sexual intensity", and feeling that it represented a "handsome legacy".

References

Alternative metal compilation albums
Faith No More albums
2003 greatest hits albums
Rhino Records compilation albums